Edmund Lowey MLC (born 12 February 1938) is a Manx politician, who is a Member of the Legislative Council in the Isle of Man.

Early life
Edmund was born in 1938 in Ballasalla and was educated at Castle Rushen and then worked for the Ronaldsway Aircraft Company from 1964, until 1975.  He then stood for the Manx Labour Party in the House of Keys election of 1975 and was elected as one of the MHKs for Rushen.  He continued in this position until his elevation to the Council in 1982.  He held several ministerial posts under Sir Miles Walker and was also a Vice Chairman of the Manx Labour Party.

Ministerial positions
Chairman of the Consumer Council, 1976–81
Chairman of the Tourism Board, 1981–86
Minister of Home Affairs, 1986–91
Minister without Portfolio, 1991–92
Minister of Industry, 1992–96
Chairman of the Manx Electricity Authority, 2011–present

References

1938 births
Members of the House of Keys 1971–1976
Members of the House of Keys 1976–1981
Members of the House of Keys 1981–1986
Members of the Legislative Council of the Isle of Man
Living people